Syllepte semilugens is a moth in the family Crambidae that is known from Cameroon, Sierra Leone and Equatorial Guinea.

The wingspan is approx. . The forewings have a fulvous yellow basal area with a subbasal black spot on the inner margin. There is a medial pale yellow band with a slight brownish point in middle of the cell. The terminal half is pale brownish with a faint dark discoidal bar and some yellowish on the costa beyond the middle. The hindwings have a pale yellow basal half, while the terminal half is pale brownish.

References

Moths described in 1912
semilugens
Taxa named by George Hampson
Moths of Africa